Giardia duodenalis, also known as Giardia intestinalis and Giardia lamblia, is a flagellated parasitic microorganism of the genus Giardia that colonizes the small intestine, causing a diarrheal condition known as giardiasis. The parasite attaches to the epithelium by a ventral adhesive disc or sucker, and reproduces via binary fission. Giardiasis does not spread via the bloodstream, nor does it spread to other parts of the gastrointestinal tract, but remains confined to the lumen of the small intestine. Giardia has an outer membrane that makes it possible to retain life, even when outside of the host body, and which can make it tolerant to chlorine disinfection. Giardia trophozoites absorb their nutrients from the lumen, and are anaerobes.  If the organism is split and stained, its characteristic pattern resembles the familiar "smiley face" symbol.

Chief pathways of human infection include ingestion of untreated drinking water (which is the most common method of transmission for this parasite), food, and soil contaminated with human feces, as well as ingestion of sewage, a phenomenon particularly common in many developing countries. Contamination of natural waters also occurs in watersheds where intensive grazing occurs.

Giardia infections occur worldwide. It is the most commonly identified intestinal parasite in the United States and Canada among children in day-care centers, hikers, family members, and immunocompromised adults. About 20,000 cases per year in the United States are reported.

Life cycle

G. duodenalis takes on two morphologically distinct forms during its lifecycle. The replicative form is a motile, pear-shaped cell that survives only in host small intestines called a trophozoite. Trophozoites swim through the intestinal mucus until they eventually adhere to the host intestinal epithelium. Adhered trophozoites then divide by binary fission, forming either more trophozoites or the nonreplicative cyst stage. Cysts pass through the host's large intestine and are shed in the feces. G. lamblia cysts are resistant to environment stressors, and can survive in the environment for weeks to months if kept moist. Cysts remain dormant until ingested by a host animal. In the new host, environmental conditions trigger the cyst to produce two trophozoites, which then attach to epithelial cells, starting the cycle anew.

Ecology and distribution
The cyst can survive for weeks to months in cold water, so can be present in contaminated wells and water systems, especially stagnant water sources, such as naturally occurring ponds, storm-water storage systems, and even clean-looking mountain streams. Cysts can also be found on surfaces, soil, food, or water that have been contaminated with feces from infected humans or animals. They may also occur in city reservoirs and persist after water treatment, as the cysts are resistant to conventional water-treatment methods, such as chlorination and ozonolysis. Zoonotic transmission is also possible, so Giardia infection is a concern for people camping in the wilderness or swimming in contaminated streams or lakes, especially the artificial lakes formed by beaver dams (hence the popular name for giardiasis, "beaver fever").

In addition to waterborne sources, fecal–oral transmission can also occur, for example in day-care centers, where children may have poor hygiene practices. Those who work with children are also at risk of being infected, as are family members of infected individuals. Not all Giardia infections are symptomatic, and many people can unknowingly serve as carriers of the parasite.

Giardia infects humans, but is also one of the most common parasites infecting cats, dogs, and birds. Mammalian hosts also include dozens of species, including cattle, sheep, and goats.

Cats can be cured easily, and lambs usually simply lose weight, but in calves, the parasites can be fatal and often are not responsive to antibiotics or electrolytes. Carriers among calves can also be asymptomatic.  This parasite is deadly for chinchillas, so extra care must be taken by providing them with safe water.  Dogs have a high infection rate, as 30% of the population under one year old are known to be infected in kennels. The infection is more prevalent in puppies than in adult dogs. Infected dogs can be isolated and treated, or the entire pack at a kennel can be treated together regardless. Kennels should also be then cleaned with bleach or other cleaning disinfectants. The grass areas used for exercise should be considered contaminated for at least one month after dogs show signs of infection, as cysts can survive in the environment for long periods of time. Prevention can be achieved by quarantine of infected dogs for at least 20 days and careful management and maintenance of a clean water supply.

Cell biology

G. duodenalis trophozoites are pear-shaped cells, 10 to 20 μm long, 7 to 10 μm across, and 2 to 4 μm thick. They are motile by way of four pairs of flagella, which propel the trophozoites through the intestine. Notably, each G. duodenalis cell has two nuclei, both of which actively transcribe genes. Adjacent to the nucleus, G. duodenalis cells have an endoplasmic reticulum that extends through much of the cell. Trophozoites about to differentiate into cysts also contain prominent vesicles termed encystation-specific vesicles that disappear once cyst wall construction begins. Unlike most other eukaryotes, G. duodenalis cells contain no visible mitochondria, but instead contains a substantially reduced metabolic organelle termed a mitosome. Additionally, cells appear to contain no Golgi bodies, and instead the secretory system consists entirely of the endoplasmic reticulum and numerous vesicles spread throughout the cell, termed peripheral vesicles. Peripheral vesicles are responsible both for taking up extracellular nutrients, and expelling waste outside the cell. Each cell also contains a pair of rigid structures called median bodies which make up part of the G. lamblia cytoskeleton. Trophozoites adhere to host epithelial cells via a specialized disk-shaped organelle called the ventral disk.

Cysts are oval-shaped cells slightly smaller than trophozoites. They lack flagella, and are covered by a smooth, clear cyst wall. Each cyst contains the organelles for two trophzoites: four nuclei, two ventral disks, etc.

Metabolism
G. lamblia primarily generates its energy by breaking down glucose via glycolysis, as well as the arginine dihydrolase pathway. It is unable to synthesize nucleotides on its own, instead salvaging them from its host. Synthesis of iron-sulfur clusters is done in a double-membrane-bound compartment called the mitosome, which is likely a remnant of mitochondria. Each cell contains 25 to 100 mitosomes divided into two categories - peripheral mitosomes, which are scattered throughout the cell, and central mitosomes, which gather at the center of the cell for unknown reasons. As in mitochondria, proteins with a certain peptide signal sequence are trafficked to and imported into the mitosome. Unlike mitochondria, mitosomes have no genome of their own. All mitosomal genes are encoded by the Giardia nuclear genome.

Genetics

Giardia and the other diplomonads are unique in their possession of two nuclei that are similar in appearance, DNA content, transcription, and time of replication. Five chromosomes occur per haploid genome.
The genome has been sequenced and was published in 2007, although the sequence contains several gaps. The sequence is about 12 million base pairs and contains about 5000 protein-coding genes. The GC content is 46%. Trophozoites have a ploidy of four and the ploidy of cysts is eight, which in turn raises the question of how Giardia maintains homogeneity between the chromosomes of the same and opposite nuclei. Modern sequencing technologies have been used to resequence different strains.

Evolution
Giardia had been assumed to be primitively asexual and with no means of transferring DNA between nuclei. These assumptions made  explaining the remarkably low level of allelic heterozygosity (< 0.01%) in the genome isolate, WB, very difficult, but all those assumptions of asexuality are now in doubt, with population genetics providing evidence for recombination and the identification of meiotic genes, evidence for recombination among isolates and the evidence for exchange of genetic material between nuclei during the process of encystation.

These findings on sexuality in Giardia, above, have important implications for understanding the origin of sexual reproduction in eukaryotes.  Though sexual reproduction is widespread among extant eukaryotes,  until recently, sex seemed unlikely to be a primordial and fundamental feature of eukaryotes.  A probable reason for the view that sex may not be fundamental to eukaryotes was that sexual reproduction previously appeared to be lacking in certain human pathogenic single-celled eukaryotes (e.g. Giardia) that diverged from early ancestors in the eukaryotic lineage.

In addition to the evidence cited above for recombination in Giardia, Malik et al. reported that many meiosis specific genes occur in the Giardia genome, and further that homologs of these genes also occur in another unicellular eukaryote, Trichomonas vaginalis.  Because these two species are descendants of lineages that are highly divergent among eukaryotes, Malik et al. suggested that these meiotic genes were present in a common ancestor of all eukaryotes.  Thus, on this view, the earliest ancestor of eukaryotes was likely capable of sexual reproduction.  Furthermore, Dacks and Roger proposed, based on phylogenetic analysis, that facultative sex was present in the common ancestor of all eukaryotes.  Bernstein et al. also reviewed evidence in support of this view.

Eight genotype assemblages of G. duodenalis have been recognized to date (A-H). Genotyping of G. duodenalis isolated from various hosts has shown that assemblages A and B infect the largest range of host species, and appear to be the main (or possibly only) G. duodenalis assemblages that undeniably infect human subjects.

Research
Frances Gillin of the University of California, San Diego, and her colleagues cultivated the entire lifecycle of this parasite in the laboratory, and identified biochemical cues in the host's digestive system that trigger Giardia'''s lifecycle transformations. They also uncovered several ways in which the parasite evades the defences of the infected organism. One of these is by altering the proteins on its surface, which confounds the ability of the infected animal's immune system to detect and combat the parasite (called antigenic variation). Gillin's work reveals why Giardia infections are extremely persistent and prone to recur. In addition, these insights into its biology and survival techniques may enable scientists to develop better strategies to understand, prevent, and treat Giardia infections.

In December 2008, Nature published an article showing the discovery of an RNA interference mechanism that allows Giardia to switch variant-specific surface proteins to avoid host immune response. The discovery was made by the team working at the Biochemistry and Molecular Biology Laboratory, School of Medicine, Catholic University of Cordoba, Argentina, led by Dr. Hugo Lujan.

The main congress about Giardia is the International Giardia and Cryptosporidium Conference. A summary of results presented at the most recent edition (2019, in Rouen, France) is available.

History

The first likely description of Giardia was in 1681 by Antonie van Leeuwenhoek, who in a letter to Robert Hooke, described "animalcules" resembling Giardia trophozoites in his stool. The next known description of Giardia wasn't until 1859, when Czech physician Vilém Lambl published a description of the trophozoite stages he saw in the stool of a pediatric patient. Lambl termed the organism Cercomonas intestinalis. In 1888, Raphaël Blanchard renamed the parasite Lamblia intestinalis in Lambl's honor. In 1915, Charles Stiles renamed the organism Giardia lamblia'' in honor of both Lambl and Professor Alfred Mathieu Giard of Paris. In 1921, Charles E. Simon published a detailed description of the parasite's morphology.

See also
 Giardiasis
 List of parasites of humans
 1998 Sydney water crisis

References

External links

 Giardia lamblia image library 
 GiardiaDB: The Giardia lamblia genome sequencing project
 Washington State Department of Health fact sheet on Giardia.
 Centers for Disease Control and Prevention (CDC) Giardia Information
 United States Environmental Protection Agency fact sheet on Giardia in water
 Giardia article at MicrobeWiki
 Video of Giardia Life Cycle 
 Giardia and the Sierra Nevada
 http://diarrhea.emedtv.com/giardia-lamblia/giardia-lambia.html 
 
 

Metamonads
Parasitic excavates
Pathogenic microbes
Waterborne diseases
Conditions diagnosed by stool test
Veterinary protozoology
Zoonoses
Protozoal diseases
Parasites of birds